Lindamere is an unincorporated community in New Castle County, Delaware, United States. Lindamere is located along U.S. Route 13 on the west bank of the Delaware River, northeast of Edgemoor.

References 

Unincorporated communities in New Castle County, Delaware
Unincorporated communities in Delaware